Åsta Holth (13 February 1904 – 16 March 1999) was a Norwegian novelist, poet and short story writer. She made her literary debut in 1944 with the short story collection Gamle bygdevegen. In 1946, she published the poetry collection Porkkalafela. She was awarded the Dobloug Prize in 1977.

Biography
Holth was born at Svullrya in Solør in the county of Hedmark, Norway.   She was of Forest Finnish descent.  Many of her written works are about the residents of  Finnskogen.  Holth published a total of 19 books. 
She made her debut in 1929 with the play I Luråsen. Her breakthrough came with her novel Kornet og freden (1955) followed by Gullsmeden (1958) and Steinen bløder (1963). Her autobiography Piga  came out in 1979. Holth was awarded the Dobloug Prize in 1977 and the King's Medal of Merit (Kongens fortjenstmedalje) in gold during 1984.

Very concerned with the preservation of Finnish culture in Norway, she founded the Finnskogdagane festival, held in the town of Svullrya every year. A memorial trail was opened during the 2017 festival.

References

1904 births
1999 deaths
People from Grue, Norway
Nynorsk-language writers
Communist Party of Norway politicians
20th-century Norwegian novelists
20th-century Norwegian poets
Norwegian women short story writers
Norwegian women novelists
20th-century Norwegian women writers
Communist women writers
Norwegian women poets
20th-century Norwegian short story writers
Norwegian people of Forest Finnish descent
Recipients of the King's Medal of Merit in gold
Dobloug Prize winners